The Golden Unicorn Awards are a set of awards for artistic excellence in film which recognises achievements of Russian cinematography and international film-makers creating Russian-themed films. The awards were established by Filip Perkon in 2016 in London, United Kingdom. The ceremony takes places annually, following Russian Film Week. 

The mission of The Golden Unicorn Awards is to bring contemporary Russian cinematography and modern Russian culture to the attention of a wider international audience. The awards also aim to improve European-Russian cultural exchange, encouraging distribution of Russian films abroad and motivating international filmmakers to produce films about Russia by introducing them to the Russian audience.

Eligibility 

Feature-length, animation, short and documentary films should be produced in Russia and released 18 months prior to the start of Russian Film Week. International films do not have to be produced in Russia but have to be Russian-themed. The film producers have to submit the films electronically or in DCP format with English subtitles through the Russian Film Week or the Golden Unicorn Awards FilmFreeway portal no later than November 1 of the relevant year.

Nomination committee 

The nomination committee review the submissions and select the films for consideration of the jury. The nomination committee is independent from the jury.

The nomination committee in 2018:

 Valeri Jerlitsyn 
 Olga Miloshunas 
 Anna Shalashina

Jury 

The independent jury consists of film industry professionals, such as filmmakers, critics, actors, professors, and producers.

The jury in 2018:

 Brian Cox – Actor, known for his appearance in BraveheartBraveheart, Doctor Who, The Bourne Identity, The Bourne Supremacy, Rise of the Planet of the Apes, Troy, Golden Globe nominated, Scottish BAFTA nominated, winner of Primetime Emmy Award for Outstanding Supporting Actor
 Olga Kurylenko – Actress, known for her appearance in Paris, le t'aims, Hitman, Quantum of Solace
 Andrew Jack – Moscow correspondent from 1990 and bureau chief at the Financial Times 1998–2004, chairman of Pushkin house 2010–2016
 Stuart Brown – BFI's Head of Programme & Acquisitions
 Nancy Condee – Professor of film at University of Pittsburgh, served as a juror at the Kinotavr Film Festival
 David P. Kelly – Executive film producer, BAFTA voting member, member of the European Film Academy
 Adam Freudenheim – Publisher and Managing Director at Pushkin Press
 Debbie McWilliams – International Casting Director, has cast 13 James Bond films, Angels and Demons, Centurion, the Silent Storm and others. She is a member of the Casting Directors Guild, the Academy of Motion Pictures and a chairperson of the International Casting Directors Network
 Carola Ash – Creative producer, Director of Europe at Academy of Motion Picture Arts and Sciences

The jury in 2017:

 Brian Cox – Actor, known for his appearance in BraveheartBraveheart, Doctor Who, The Bourne Identity, The Bourne Supremacy, Rise of the Planet of the Apes, Troy, Golden Globe nominated, Scottish BAFTA nominated, winner of Primetime Emmy Award for Outstanding Supporting Actor
 Andrew Jack – Moscow correspondent from 1990 and bureau chief at the Financial Times 1998–2004, chairman of Pushkin house 2010–2016
 Stuart Brown – BFI's Head of Programme & Acquisitions
 Nancy Condee – Professor of Film at University of Pittsburgh, served as a juror at the Kinotavr Film Festival
 David P. Kelly – Executive film producer, BAFTA voting member, member of the European Film Academy
 Michael Bird – the British Council's Director Russia
 Peter Bradshaw – Writer and chief film critic for The Guardian, contributor to BBC One, Esquire, Radio 4 and the London Review of Books
 Elliot Grove – Film producer, founder of the Raindance Film Festival and the British Independent Film Awards
 Anna MacDonald – Co-founder and principal of the London Film Academy

Ceremony 

The ceremony  takes place every year in a form of a charitable gala following the Russian Film Week. The Golden Unicorn Awards collaborated with the Naked Heart Foundation to fundraise GBP 160,000  during the Russian Film Week and the main ceremony in 2018. The awards also raised GBP 85,000  for the Gift of Life Charity  in 2016.

Golden unicorn symbol 

The symbol of the golden unicorn was chosen as a common notion for the Russian and British nations. The golden unicorn was depicted on the Russian Coat of Arms along with St. George in 16th-century Russia. The golden unicorn is also one of the symbols of Great Britain.

Nominations 

The Golden Unicorn is awarded for the following categories:

 Best Feature Film 
 Best Screenplay  
 Best Actor 
 Best Actress 
 Best Short Film
 Best Documentary 
 Best Animated Film 
 Best Foreign Film with a Russian connection

Special awards:

 Best Contribution to Promoting Russian Culture Abroad 
 Best Emerging Talent
 General Producer's Award

Winners

References

British film awards